OIC or Organisation of Islamic Cooperation is an international organisation of Muslim nations.

OIC may also refer to:
Offer in compromise, an agreement to reduce debt to the United States Internal Revenue Service
Officer in Charge (Philippines), the specific status of a temporary head of a local government or agency in the Philippines
Officer in charge (police), a gazetted officer in command of a police station in Sri Lanka
Officer in Command, primarily used in the United States Uniformed Services as well as police and sheriff's departments
Two incarnations of the Oklahoma Intercollegiate Conference: Oklahoma Intercollegiate Conference (1914–1928),  Oklahoma Intercollegiate Conference (1974–1997)
Opportunities Industrialization Center, a nonprofit adult education and job training organisation headquartered in Philadelphia, Pennsylvania, United States.
Open Interconnect Consortium
Opioid-induced constipation
Order of the Imitation of Christ, a monastic order in the Syro-Malankara Catholic Church
Orkney Islands Council, the local government authority for Orkney, Scotland, United Kingdom
OIC, the IATA code for Lt. Warren Eaton Airport in Norwich, New York, United States
Octahydroindole-2-carboxylic Acid (Oic)
Office of the Independent Counsel, an office of the U.S. Department of Justice
Outline in Color, a rock band from Tulsa, Oklahoma, United States